This is a list of representation theory topics, by Wikipedia page. See also list of harmonic analysis topics, which is more directed towards the mathematical analysis aspects of representation theory.

See also: Glossary of representation theory

General representation theory

Linear representation
Unitary representation
Trivial representation
Irreducible representation
Semisimple
Complex representation
Real representation
Quaternionic representation
Pseudo-real representation
Symplectic representation
Schur's lemma
Restricted representation

Representation theory of groups

Group representation
Group ring
Maschke's theorem
Regular representation
Character (mathematics)
Character theory
Class function
Representation theory of finite groups
Modular representation theory
Frobenius reciprocity
Restricted representation
Induced representation
Peter–Weyl theorem
Young tableau
Spherical harmonic
Hecke operator
Representation theory of the symmetric group
Representation theory of diffeomorphism groups
 Permutation representation
 Affine representation
 Projective representation
Central extension

Representation theory of Lie groups and Lie algebras 

Representation of a Lie group
Lie algebra representation, Representation of a Lie superalgebra
Universal enveloping algebra
Casimir element
Infinitesimal character
Harish-Chandra homomorphism
Fundamental representation
Antifundamental representation
Bifundamental representation
Adjoint representation
Weight (representation theory)
Cartan's theorem
Spinor
Wigner's classification, Representation theory of the Poincaré group
Wigner–Eckart theorem
Stone–von Neumann theorem
Orbit method
Kirillov character formula
Weyl character formula
Discrete series representation
Principal series representation
Borel–Weil–Bott theorem
Weyl's character formula

Representation theory of algebras

Algebra representation
Representation theory of Hopf algebras

Representation theory